David Churton (born 29 March 1975) is an English cricketer. He played twenty first-class matches for Cambridge University Cricket Club between 1995 and 1997.

See also
 List of Cambridge University Cricket Club players

References

External links
 

1975 births
Living people
English cricketers
Cambridge University cricketers
Sportspeople from Salisbury